People in Luck (French title: Les veinards), is a 1963 French comedy film directed by Philippe de Broca and Jean Girault, written by Jacques Vilfrid and Jean Girault and starring France Anglade and Louis de Funès (uncredited). The film is known under the titles People in Luck or The Lucky (English), Die Glückspilze or Fünf Glückspilze (German) and I fortunati (Italian).

Cast 
 France Anglade as Corinne ("Le yacht" segment )
 Francis Blanche as Bricheton
 Blanchette Brunoy as Mrs Beaurepaire ("Un gros lot" segment)
 Daniel Ceccaldi as Gros nounours ("Le repas gastronomique" segment )
 Louis de Funès as Antoine Beaurepaire
 France Rumilly as Danielle Beaurepaire
 Noël Roquevert as Le bijoutier
 Max Montavon as Un vendeur de la bijouterie
 Jean Ozenne as Le réceptionniste de l'hôtel
 Robert Rollis as Le chauffeur de taxi
 Jack Ary as an agent
 René Hell as Un vendeur de journaux
 Nono Zammit as an agent
 Henri Lambert as Le « balafré »
 Jean-Claude Brialy as L'automobiliste
 Adrien Cayla-Legrand as A passerby
 André Chanu
 Jean-Lou Reynolds
 Philippe Dehesdin
 Pierre Tornade
 Michel Gonzalès

References

External links 
 
 Les Veinards (1962) at the Films de France

1963 films
French comedy films
1960s French-language films
French anthology films
French black-and-white films
Films directed by Philippe de Broca
Films directed by Jean Girault
1960s French films